North Hill is a mountain in Albany County, New York. It is located northwest of Rensselaerville. Henry Hill is located northwest and Still Hill is located east-southeast of North Hill.

References

Mountains of Albany County, New York
Mountains of New York (state)